The 1973 Rebel 500 was a NASCAR Winston Cup Series race that took place on April 15, 1973, at Darlington Raceway in Darlington, South Carolina.

Race report
The total time of the race was four hours and four minutes. There were eleven cautions for seventy-one laps. David Pearson defeated Benny Parsons by thirteen laps in front of forty-eight thousand people.

Early in the race on lap 2, a 5 car accident happened in Turn 2. Buddy Arrington, Richie Panch, Dave Marcis, Lennie Pond, and Dean Dalton were involved. Marcis and Pond would eventually go on to retire due to crash related problems. Cale Yarborough would suffer a spin also early in the race. Paul Tyler and Bobby Issac would also spin in the race. James Hylton would smash into the wall, causing a caution. Charlie Roberts would also suffer engine failures, causing another caution. The 10th caution would come out with an accident including Cale Yarborough and G.C. Spencer. With Pearson leading the next restart, it only took one turn to turn Turn 1 into a "junkyard", with a 7 car crash, including Parsons, Petty, Arrington, Mayne, Brooks, and more involved, causing the 11th caution.

Only twelve cars finished this race because of a massive 21-car crash.

This race stands as the second largest margin of victory in Cup history, falling just short of Ned Jarrett and his 14 lap differential in the 1965 Southern 500. 

Notable crew chiefs for this race were Tim Brewer, Jake Elder, Travis Carter, Harry Hyde, Dale Inman, and Bud Moore.

Qualifying

Finishing order
Section reference:

References

Rebel 500
Rebel 500
NASCAR races at Darlington Raceway